Jane Seymour  (born Joyce Penelope Wilhelmina Frankenberg; 15 February 1951) is an English actress. After making her screen debut as an uncredited extra in the 1969 musical comedy Oh! What a Lovely War, Seymour transitioned to leading roles in film and television, including a leading role in the television series The Onedin Line (1972–1973) and the role of psychic Bond girl Solitaire in the James Bond film Live and Let Die (1973).

Critical acclaim followed with a nomination for the Primetime Emmy Award for Outstanding Lead Actress in a Limited Series or Movie for Captains and the Kings (1976). In 1982, Seymour won her first Golden Globe for Best Actress in a Miniseries or Television Film for the miniseries East of Eden (1981). She received additional Golden Globe nominations in the same category for the television film The Woman He Loved (1988), in which she portrayed the American twice-divorced wife of King Edward VIII, Wallis Simpson, and the miniseries War and Remembrance (1988-1989), for which she was nominated twice consecutively in addition to receiving another Emmy nomination. By this time, Seymour had won a Primetime Emmy Award for Outstanding Supporting Actress in a Limited Series or Movie for Onassis: The Richest Man in the World (1988), in which she played Maria Callas. In 1993, Seymour was cast as Dr. Michaela Quinn in the television series Dr. Quinn, Medicine Woman, a medical drama set in the Wild West which ran for 6 seasons and resulted in a further two Emmy nominations and four Golden Globe nominations, including one win. Seymour was given a star on the Hollywood Walk of Fame and, in 2000, was appointed an Officer of the Order of the British Empire.

Seymour's other film roles include Somewhere in Time (1980), The Scarlet Pimpernel (1982), La Révolution française (1989), Wedding Crashers (2005), Love, Wedding, Marriage (2011), Little Italy (2018), The War with Grandpa (2020) and Friendsgiving (2020).

In addition to her acting career, Seymour is the founder of the Open Hearts Foundation as well as an author, having (co-)written several children's books and self-help books. Under the Jane Seymour Designs label, she has created jewellery, scarves, furniture, rugs, handbags, paintings and sculptures.

Early life
Joyce Penelope Wilhelmina Frankenberg was born on 15 February 1951 in Uxbridge, Middlesex (now part of Greater London), England, to Mieke van Tricht (1914–2007), a nurse, and Benjamin John Frankenberg FRCOG (19141990), a distinguished gynaecologist and obstetrician. Her father was Jewish; he was born in England, to a family from Nowe Trzepowo, a village in Poland. Her mother was a Dutch Protestant (with family from Deventer) who was a prisoner of war during World War II and had lived in the Dutch East Indies (now Indonesia). Seymour has stated she learned Dutch from her mother and her fellow survivors from the Japanese internment camp, who frequently spent holidays together in the Netherlands when she was a child. Encouraged by her parents (who sent her to live with family friends in Geneva to practise her languages), she learned to speak fluent French.

Seymour's paternal grandfather Lee Grahame had come to live in the East End of London after escaping the Czarist pogroms when he was 14. He is listed in the 1911 census as living in Bethnal Green working as a hairdresser and went on to establish his own company. Seymour's father Benjamin qualified at the UCL Medical School in 1938. He joined the medical branch of the RAFVR after the outbreak of war, serving in England, Belgium, Italy and South Africa, ending his service as a squadron leader with a mention in despatches. After the war, Frankenberg continued his career at various London hospitals, including St Leonard's Hospital, Hackney, the East End Maternity Hospital, the City of London Maternity Hospital and finally Hillingdon Hospital, for which he designed the maternity unit. A close associate of Patrick Steptoe, he assisted in pioneering discussions on in-vitro fertilisation and published papers on adolescent and teenage sexual behaviours.

Seymour was educated at Tring Park School for the Performing Arts in Hertfordshire. She chose the screen name Jane Seymour, after the English queen Jane Seymour, because it seemed more saleable. One of Seymour's notable features is heterochromia, making her right eye brown and her left eye green.

Acting career
In 1969, Seymour appeared uncredited in her first film, Richard Attenborough's Oh! What a Lovely War. In 1970, Seymour appeared in her first major film role in the war drama The Only Way. She played Lillian Stein, a Jewish woman seeking shelter from Nazi persecution. In 1973, she gained her first major television role as Emma Callon in the successful 1970s series The Onedin Line. During this time, she appeared as female lead Prima in the two part television miniseries Frankenstein: The True Story. She appeared as Winston Churchill's girlfriend Pamela Plowden in Young Winston, produced by her father-in-law Richard Attenborough.

In 1973, Seymour achieved international fame in her role as Bond girl Solitaire in the James Bond film Live and Let Die. IGN ranked her as 10th in a Top 10 Bond Babes list. In 1975, Seymour was cast as Princess Farah in Sinbad and the Eye of the Tiger, the third part of Ray Harryhausen's Sinbad trilogy. The film was not released until its stop motion animation sequences had been completed in 1977. In 1978, she appeared as Serina in the Battlestar Galactica film  and in the first five episodes of the television series. Seymour returned to the big screen in the comedy Oh Heavenly Dog opposite Chevy Chase.

In 1980, Seymour played the role on stage of Constanze in Peter Shaffer's play Amadeus, opposite Ian McKellen as Salieri and Tim Curry as Mozart. The play premiered on Broadway in 1980, ran for 1,181 performances and was nominated for seven Tony Awards, of which it won five.

Also in 1980, Seymour was given the role of young theatre actress Elise McKenna in the period romance Somewhere in Time. Though the film was made with a markedly limited budget, the role enticed Seymour with a character she felt she knew. The effort was a decided break from her earlier work, and marked the start of her friendship with co-star Christopher Reeve.

In 1981, she appeared in the television film East of Eden, based on the novel by John Steinbeck. Her portrayal of main antagonist Cathy Ames won her a Golden Globe. In 1982, she appeared in The Scarlet Pimpernel with Anthony Andrews and her Amadeus costar Ian McKellen. In 1984, Seymour appeared nude in the film Lassiter, co-starring Tom Selleck, but the film was a box office flop. In 1987, Seymour was the subject of a pictorial in Playboy magazine, although she did not pose nude.

In 1988, Seymour got the female lead in the twelve part television miniseries War and Remembrance, the continued story from the miniseries The Winds of War. She played Natalie Henry, an American Jewish woman trapped in Europe during World War II. That same year, she won an Emmy Award for playing Maria Callas in the television movie Onassis: The Richest Man in the World.

In 1989, on the occasion of the 200th anniversary of the French Revolution, Seymour appeared in the television film La révolution française, filmed in both French and English. Seymour appeared as the doomed French queen, Marie Antoinette; Seymour's two children, Katherine and Sean, appeared as the queen's children.

In the 1990s, Seymour earned popular and critical praise for her role as Dr. Michaela "Mike" Quinn in the television series Dr. Quinn, Medicine Woman and its television sequels (1993–2001). Her work on the series earned her a second Golden Globe Award. While working on the series Dr. Quinn, Medicine Woman, she met her fourth husband, actor director James Keach.

In the 2000s, Seymour continued to work primarily in television. In 2004 and 2005, she made six guest appearances in The WB series Smallville, playing Genevieve Teague, the wealthy, scheming mother of Jason Teague (Jensen Ackles). In 2005, Seymour returned to the big screen in the comedy Wedding Crashers, playing Kathleen Cleary, wife of fictional United States Secretary of the Treasury William Cleary, played by Christopher Walken. In spring 2006, she appeared in the short lived The WB series Modern Men. Later that year, Seymour guest-starred as a law-school-professor on an episode of the CBS sitcom How I Met Your Mother and as a wealthy client on the Fox legal drama Justice. In 2007, she guest-starred in the ABC sitcom In Case of Emergency. She also appeared in ITV's Marple: Ordeal By Innocence, based on the Agatha Christie novel. She was a contestant on season five of the US reality show Dancing with the Stars; she finished in sixth place, along with her partner Tony Dovolani. Seymour guest starred in "One Life to Lose", a  soap opera-themed episode of the ABC crime-dramedy Castle.

Seymour appeared in the Hallmark Channel film Dear Prudence (2008); the romantic comedy Love, Wedding, Marriage (2011); and the Hallmark Movie Channel film Lake Effects (2012).

In April 2016, she starred as Florence Lancaster in Noël Coward's play The Vortex, presented in Singapore by the British Theatre Playhouse. In 2022, Seymour became the leading character and executive producer in the Irish TV series Harry Wild.

Personal life

Seymour has been married and divorced four times. Her first marriage, to Michael Attenborough, the son of film actor and director Richard Attenborough, was from 1971 to 1973. She was then briefly married to Attenborough's friend Geoffrey Planer from 1977 to 1978.

In 1981, Seymour married David Flynn. The marriage produced two children: Katherine Flynn (born on 7 February 1982) and Sean Flynn (born on 31 July 1985). Flynn had involved her in the housing market, an involvement which left her "completely beyond bankrupt". They divorced in 1992. The following year, Seymour married actor James Keach. Together they had twins, John Stacy and Kristopher Steven, born 30 November 1995, and named after family friends Johnny Cash and Christopher Reeve and James's brother, actor Stacy Keach.

In February 2005, Seymour became a naturalised citizen of the United States.

Seymour is a celebrity ambassador for Childhelp, a national nonprofit organisation dedicated to helping victims of child abuse and neglect. In 2007, she sponsored a children's Art Pillow contest as part of the Jane Seymour Collection, with the proceeds going to Childhelp.

On 12 April 2013, it was announced that Seymour was divorcing Keach. The divorce was finalized in December 2015.

In February 2018, she posed for Playboy for a third time, becoming at the age of 67 the oldest woman to be photographed for the magazine. In the Playboy interview, Seymour revealed that she briefly quit acting after being sexually harassed by an unnamed film producer in the early 1970s.

Writing and fashion careers
In the 1980s, Seymour began a parallel career as a writer of self-help and inspirational books, including Jane Seymour's Guide to Romantic Living (1986), Two at a Time: Having Twins (2002), Remarkable Changes (2003) and Among Angels (2010). She also co-wrote several children's books, with her then husband James Keach, for the This One 'N That One series.

In 1985, Seymour appeared at Fashion Aid, a one time fashion show fundraiser held at the Royal Albert Hall in London. An event organised by Bob Geldof to raise funds for the ongoing Ethiopian famine, the finale of the show saw her partake in a fake marriage with Freddie Mercury. Seymour wore a white lace wedding dress that was designed by David and Elizabeth Emanuel – who had previously created Princess Diana's wedding gown.

In 2008, Seymour replaced Selina Scott as the new face of fashion label CC (formerly known as Country Casuals) under the Austin Reed banner of retailers.

Likewise in 2008, Seymour teamed up with and designed the "Open Heart Collection" for Kay Jewelers, which promoted it with the advice, "Keep your heart open and love will always find its way in." Beginning that year, she saw to it that she would always be wearing one of the collection's necklaces whenever seen in public while not in character for any of her acting performances. In the same year, Seymour also wrote and published the books Open Hearts: If Your Heart Is Open, love Will Always Find Its Way In and Open Hearts Family.

A 2.08-carat cushion-cut fancy vivid blue diamond in an 18-karat rose-gold-plated platinum setting was named "The Jane Seymour" in her honour by World of Diamonds Group, which had mined it in Russia, cut and set it. The ring was presented to Seymour in April 2016 in Singapore while she was there to star in The Vortex.

Bibliography
 Jane Seymour's Guide to Romantic Living. Macmillan Publishers, 1986. ASIN: B003JFVAKC.
 Gus Loved His Happy Home. With Seymour Fleishman. Linnet Books, 1989. 
 Yum!: A Tale of Two Cookies. This One 'N That One series. With James Keach. Angel Gate, 1998. 
 Boing!: No Bouncing on the Bed. This One 'N That One series. With James Keach. Putnam Juvenile, 1999. 
 Splat!: The Tale of a Colorful Cat. This One 'N That One series. With James Keach. Turtleback Books, 2001. 
 Two at a Time: Having Twins: The Journey Through Pregnancy and Birth. With Pamela Patrick Novotny. Atria Books, 2002. 
 Remarkable Changes: Turning Life's Challenges into Opportunities. New York: HarperEntertainment, 2003. 
 Making Yourself at Home: Finding Your Style and Putting It All Together. DK Adult, 2007. 
 Open Hearts: If Your Heart Is Open, Love Will Always Find Its Way In. Running Press, 2008. 
 Among Angels. Guideposts, 2010.

Filmography

Awards
1981 Saturn Award for Somewhere in Time (1980)
1982 Golden Globe for East of Eden (1981)
1988 Emmy Award for Onassis: The Richest Man in the World (1988)
1996 Golden Globe Award for Dr. Quinn Medicine Woman (1993)
2000 OBE Officer of the Order of the British Empire (Civil Division) - 2000 New Years Honours List. "For services to acting and entertainment".
2010 Ellis Island Medal of Honor

References

External links

1951 births
20th-century American actresses
20th-century English actresses
21st-century American actresses
21st-century English actresses
Actresses from Malibu, California
American film actresses
American people of Dutch descent
American people of Polish-Jewish descent
American self-help writers
American television actresses
Best Drama Actress Golden Globe (television) winners
Best Miniseries or Television Movie Actress Golden Globe winners
English emigrants to the United States
English film actresses
English people of Dutch descent
English people of Polish-Jewish descent
English self-help writers
English television actresses
Living people
Officers of the Order of the British Empire
Outstanding Performance by a Supporting Actress in a Miniseries or Movie Primetime Emmy Award winners
Participants in American reality television series
People educated at the Arts Educational Schools
People educated at Tring Park School for the Performing Arts
People from Hayes, Hillingdon
People with acquired American citizenship